Government Thirumagal Mill's College, is a general degree college located in Gudiyattam, Vellore district, Tamil Nadu. It was established in the year 1964. The college is affiliated with Thiruvalluvar University. This college offers different courses in arts, commerce and science. K. A. Shanmuga Mudaliar donated 47 acres of his own land and Rupees 5 lakhs to built this college.

Departments

Science
Physics
Chemistry
Mathematics
Botany
Zoology
Computer Science
Computer Application

Arts and Commerce
Tamil
English
History
Economics
Business Administration
Commerce

Accreditation
The college is  recognized by the University Grants Commission (UGC).

See also
Education in India
Literacy in India
List of educational institutions in Vellore
List of institutions of higher education in Tamil Nadu

References

External links
http://www.gtmc.edu.in

Educational institutions established in 1964
1964 establishments in Madras State
Colleges affiliated to Thiruvalluvar University
Academic institutions formerly affiliated with the University of Madras
Universities and colleges in Vellore district